The Vicksburg Bridge is a cantilever bridge carrying Interstate 20 and U.S. Route 80 across the Mississippi River between Delta, Louisiana and Vicksburg, Mississippi.

Next to it is the Old Vicksburg Bridge.

The Vicksburg Bridge is the northernmost crossing of the Mississippi River in Louisiana open to motor vehicles.

In 2013 state officials announced projects to improve the stability of the bridge, and to install underwater radar to assist barge captains in avoiding the bridge, which had been struck by barges repeatedly since its construction.

References

See also
List of crossings of the Lower Mississippi River

Bridges over the Mississippi River
Road bridges in Louisiana
Road bridges in Mississippi
Interstate 20
U.S. Route 80
Bridges on the Interstate Highway System
Bridges of the United States Numbered Highway System
Bridges completed in 1973
Cantilever bridges in the United States
Buildings and structures in Madison Parish, Louisiana
Buildings and structures in Warren County, Mississippi
Interstate vehicle bridges in the United States